Municipio de Gonzalo is a small town in Monte Plata Province, Dominican Republic. The main source of income is cattle ranching and agriculture.

Populated places in Monte Plata Province
Populated places in the Dominican Republic